Kenneth S. Halverson (July 24, 1933 – January 21, 2021) was a Republican member of the Pennsylvania House of Representatives.

References

Republican Party members of the Pennsylvania House of Representatives
1933 births
2021 deaths